Khatam County is in Yazd province, Iran. The capital of the county is the city of Herat. At the 2006 census, the county's population was 31,695 in 8,144 households. The following census in 2011 counted 35,158 people in 9,512 households. At the 2016 census, the county's population was 36,562 in 10,811 households. After the census, Marvast District was elevated to the status of Marvast County.

Administrative divisions

The population history of Khatam County's administrative divisions over three consecutive censuses is shown in the following table. The latest census shows two districts, four rural districts, and two cities.

References

 

Counties of Yazd Province